Pauktuutit is an organization in Canada that represents Inuit women.  It was officially started in 1984 and is headquartered in Ottawa for easier access to the Parliament of Canada.  Every Canadian Inuit woman is considered to be a member of Pauktuutit.  Thus, no woman needs to pay for membership.

The organization is meant to promote social equality for Inuit women, children's rights, and the improvement of living conditions for Inuit women.  It also strives to obtain a larger role for Inuit women in Canadian politics, to preserve Inuit culture, and to encourage personal independence among Inuit women.  To these ends, Pauktuutit has spoken out against sexual abuse of children and physical abuse of women, and has been concerned with housing.

Similar organizations include the Inuit Tapiriit Kanatami, which represents all Inuit Canadians; there is also the Native Women's Association of Canada, which represents Aboriginal women, recognized by Pauktuutit as an ally.  However, scholars have noted the Native Women's Association of Canada has enjoyed more representation in meetings of Canadian leaders than Pauktuutit.

References

External links 

 Pauktuutit website

1984 establishments in Ontario
Inuit in Canada
Inuit organizations
Organizations based in Ottawa
Indigenous rights organizations in Canada
Women's organizations based in Canada
Organizations established in 1984
Indigenous organizations in Ontario
Women in Ontario